Greek National Road 7 (abbreviated as EO7) is a single carriageway with at-grade intersections in the Peloponnese region in southern Greece. It connects the cities of Corinth and Kalamata, via Nemea, Argos, Tripoli and Megalopoli. It has been succeeded in importance by the Moreas Motorway (Corinth–Kalamata), which is numbered A7.

7
Roads in Peloponnese (region)